Arthur Knautz (20 March 1911 in Daaden – 6 August 1943) was a German field handball player who competed in the 1936 Summer Olympics. He was part of the German field handball team, which won the gold medal. He played two matches including the final.

He was killed in action during World War II.

References

External links
profile

1911 births
1943 deaths
German male handball players
Olympic handball players of Germany
Field handball players at the 1936 Summer Olympics
Olympic gold medalists for Germany
Olympic medalists in handball
People from Altenkirchen
Medalists at the 1936 Summer Olympics
German military personnel killed in World War II
Sportspeople from Rhineland-Palatinate